The Birkat haMinim ( "Blessing on the heretics") is a curse on heretics which forms part of the Jewish rabbinical liturgy. It is the twelfth in the series of eighteen benedictions (Shemoneh Esreh) that constitute the core of prayer service in the statutory daily 'standing prayer' of religious Jews.

There has been a general consensus that the eighteen benedictions generally go back to some form in the Second Temple period but the origins of this particular prayer and its earliest wording are disputed in modern scholarship, between those who argue for a very early date, either sometime prior to, or roughly contemporary with the Roman conquest of Jerusalem in 70 CE, and those who hold that the formulation crystallized several decades or centuries later. Pinning down its date figures prominently since it is widely taken to indicate the moment when a definitive rupture arose between Judaism and Christianity.

In the early premodern form in Europe, the curse was applied to several kinds of people or groups: Jews who apostasized to Christianity; Christians themselves; the enemies of the Jews, and to the governing authorities of the Christian world. From the 13th century, the terminology used in the prayer and rabbinical explications of their referent, Christians, began to undergo a process of censorship, imposed from outside or regulated internally, once Christian authorities learnt of them through information supplied by Jewish converts and from scholars who began to access the texts in the original language.

There is no single, uniform Ashkenazi or Sephardic liturgy, and marked differences may exist between prayer books issued by the rabbinates in, for example, England, Israel, or the United States. In modern times, Jews who regularly attend the synagogue only on the Sabbath rarely hear it, if ever since on the Sabbath and holidays an alternative version lacking reference to minim is used. It is mandated for prayer every day among Orthodox Jews, and is recited five times by precentors six days every week.

Terminology
The expression Birkat haMinim, is composed of birkat  meaning "benediction" and minim, a plural of min, a plurivalent umbrella term of opprobrium in rabbinic literature meaning "kinds, sorts". The Birkat haMinim is not specific: the term itself has been called a classic example of "'Them', those who disagree with 'Us', heretics, Others". These minim are one of several classes in the Tosefta and the Jerusalem Talmud, the others being perushim (separatists), poshim (sinners) and zedim (arrogant ones). In context it refers to sectarians and heretics, the generic concept being denoted by minut, and came to bear the latter narrow sense when Rabbinic Judaism became normative. The "benediction" is a euphemism for what is in effect an imprecation against those who are thought to have separated themselves, doctrinally and in practice, from beliefs and observances that came to inform the core of Judaism.

Min is one of several terms – apikoros, kofer, meshummadin    and tsadoki- used in the Talmud tractates to refer to varieties of freethinkers, religious dissidents and dissenters, or those who subscribe to the notion of the existence of "two worlds" (thought generally to be a reference to the Sadducees). In one text of the Babylonian Talmud min  was even defined as a pagan who worshipped idols. The term could also be used of gentiles whose practices were similar to those Judaism defined as heretical.

Some 24 'kinds' or sects are mentioned classically as falling within this category, a calculation attributed to the Palestinian Amora Yohanan ben haNapah, in a context where it was claimed their existence was the cause of Israel's exile Maimonides attempted to sort out and define precisely the distinctions between these groups but modern scholarship has failed to determine the precise original target groups denoted by this terminology.

Heresy

Heresy is "a method of converting difference into exclusion",  The emergence of a concept of heresy in Judaism coincides roughly with the development in Christianity of the same concept, hairesis – a word that is often translated as "sect". In both instances it assumed a pejorative sense. Minim initially were those within the fold halakhically (legally), perhaps disputative Jewish insiders like the Pharisees and Sadducees, who disagreed with broader rabbinical opinions on doctrine, although probably most Jews in this period were not at all 'rabbinical'. Whatever happened at Yavne, where tradition assigns the composition of the prayer, many scholars, among them Shaye J. D. Cohen, hold that thereafter, the sectarianism of Jewish communities prior to 70 CE was buried, as minim were threshed out: a growing rabbinical "grand coalition" would have generated a non-sectarian environment with no organized internal challenges, in contrast to the heated sectarian vexations of early Christianity. The process of defining heresy in both Judaism and Christianity nonetheless, it has been argued, is virtually identical in having developed in both along similar lines.

Text

The text survives in two core versions, one being that of the Babylonian Talmud. In 1898 Solomon Schechter, with Israel Abrahams, published a 9th-10 century CE version of a Hebrew prayer which had been recovered from the Cairo Geniza, and his subsequent findings would revolutionize the study of Jewish liturgy. The peculiarity of this version was that, together with minim, referring to heretics generally, it specifically added a distinct group, Nazarenes. The Genizah actually conserved 86 manuscripts containing six versions of the Birkat haMinim. The Jerusalem Talmud version reads:
For the apostates (meshumaddim) let there be no hope, and uproot the kingdom of arrogance (malkhut zadom), speedily and in our days. May the Nazarenes (ha-naẓarim/noṣrim/notzrim)  and the sectarians (minim) perish as in a moment. Let them be blotted out  of the book of life, and not be written together with the righteous. You are praised, O Lord, who subdues the arrogant.

This is embedded in a baraita of the tractate on Blessings (b. Ber. 28bb–29a) written during the Mishnaic period. Early modern printed editions, including the Soncino edition of 1484, have a slightly different version in which the minim are identified as the Sadducees. The addition of Nazarenes to the standard reading suggested that, were the Talmudic accounts of the formulation of the prayer historically grounded, a Jewish consensus that Christians in their fold were heretical had consolidated itself already by the first decades after the destruction of the Second Temple.

Formal bans to expel or suspend dissidents from the community were not yet in place in this period. There were two kinds of ban, niddui and ḥerem, neither of which had been formalized in the first and second centuries: further, no good evidence survives of their use against minim at this time. There are no rabbinic references to ḥerem in the sense of an excommunication or ban prior to the 3rd century CE, while niddui appears to reference to disciplinary action demanding compliance in obedience in order to bring straying Jews back into the fold of the synagogue.

Historical context
At precisely what stage this specific addition was introduced however is not known: hypotheses vary, from prior to the establishment of Yavne during the Second Temple period, to some time after its establishment in 73 CE, to Ephraim E. Urbach's claim that it was introduced shortly after the revolt of Bar Kochba (ca.135 C.E.), – a hypothesis linked to the first apparent reference to a curse against Christians in a work by Justin Martyr written within some decades of that war. Others such as Pieter W. van der Horst argue for a date just prior to Jerome's time (347–420 C.E.), since, in his commentary on Amos, he first makes explicit a reference to Jewish cursing of (Jewish-Christian) Nazarenes.

The earliest rabbinic reference to the blessing is in a passage at Tosefta Berakhot 3:25 redacted in the mid 3rd century, but reflecting an earlier source, where minim are mentioned in a blessing of the Pharisees (פְּרוּשִׁים), implying the two were identical. The wording has long been a stumbling block, and subject to many attempts at emendation. Saul Lieberman has argued that it is to be taken as denoting 'Separatists' generically, and not the particular group known by that appellation in the New Testament and Josephus.

The earliest external sources explicitly alluding to this Birkat haMinim content thus date to the 3-4th centuries. It is firmly attested as ensconced in rabbinical liturgy by the middle of the first millennium. Rabbinical texts are not reliable for accurate dating of events for this period. For one, they conflate strata of commentary from distinct historical periods. The problem has been to determine therefore what precise meaning was attached to minim in three distinct periods: (a) in Tannaic texts (b) in the Amoraic literature of Palestine and (c) the Amoraic works produced in Babylon in the last of which the word for Nazarenes finally emerges. In the earliest stratum, of 22 references to minim, most indicate broadly sectarians, Samaritans and also perhaps Jewish Gnostics.   Collectively in both the Tanna and Amora references, minim refer almost always to Jewish heretics.

On one hand it is argued that backdating later practices and liturgy to the early post-destruction period suited the vested interest of rabbis in securing their authority by appeal to an earlier foundational moment, such as at Yavne. Gamaliel 11 headed the Yavne Academy from approximately 80CE to 115CE, and Martyn speaks of a consensus that the rewording of the benediction dates to around 85 CE, on the assumption that Samuel the Small must have been very old at the time, dying before 90CE or sometime thereafter in Gamaliel's time.  The Mishnah in its final redaction by Judah ha-Nasi (ca.200 CE) records that Gamaliel's rule of the full 18 prayers was contested by three rabbis, who proposed a short or summary prayer in their stead.

Yavne

The Babylonian Talmud states that the minim benediction was instituted in Yavne, and preserves a story at Berakhot 28b-29a about the origin of the 18 benedictions, and specifically, of how the imprecation against heretics emerged:

According to this standard account of the formulation ('fixing' i.e. tiqqen), the prayer emerged after the destruction of Jerusalem in 70CE, when Yohanan ben Zakkai and his disciples were permitted to settle in Yavne, where they are said to have constituted a Torah academy for halakhic study, a bet din to try capital cases, with the issuing of nine enactments (taqqanoth). The assembly gradually came to see itself as a successor to the Sanhedrin of Jerusalem. The specific grounds for the curse, in this traditional view according to Shaye J. D. Cohen, arose from the atmosphere of crisis induced by the catastrophic events earlier, at Yavne the Pharisees interdicted sectarianism, expelled all those who did not belong to their group, excommunicated Jews of Christian observance, expunged the biblical canon of all works written in Greek and having an apocalyptic tone, in order to establish an exclusivist orthodoxy. The introduction of this form of the curse, in one view, functioned to 'smoke out' the minim. If a reader faltered in reciting the prayer, i.e. to curse oneself would be tantamount to thanking God for bringing about their own destruction, they would fall under suspicion, and risk expulsion from the congregation.

References to prayers in the Second Temple period often locate them in private homes, and were not typical of synagogue practices, though daily communal prayer was practiced at Qumran. A general consensus was that the mention of Gamaliel 11 supports a date between 80-120CE, though it is possible to argue that he has been confused with his father Gamaliel the Elder, which would imply an earlier date. The reliability of the account has been questioned, and whether such an academy was established and a decision of this kind made at that time remain controversial. Daniel Boyarin, for one, considers it a myth.

The words 'they ordained it at Jamnia (Yavne)', together with the anecdote of the role of Simeon ha Paqoli, appear to clash with the reference to 'the men of the great synagogue' who 'ordained Prayers for Israel' mentioned later in the tractate at Ber.33a, and to the comment that 'one hundred and twenty elders, prophets among them, ordained the Eighteen Benedictions in order' in the Megilla tractate (17b), which implies that the prayers date back to the time of Ezra (480–440 BCE), and therefore must be devoid of anti-Christian resonance. The apparent differences can be harmonized if one assumes, on the basis of Megilla 18a, that the benedictions had been forgotten over the centuries and then recalled and reordered at Yavne. Boyarin on the other hand takes the whole passage as apocryphal: there was, he claims, simply no institutionalized rabbinic authority which would have had hegemonic authority to make a binding decree of such a prayer from West Asia to Rome down through to the end of the 2nd century, as implied. The story in this view is the result of a retroactive ascription in which Gamaliel functions as a 'cypher for so-called anti-sectarian activity'.

Eliezer ben Hyrcanus

There is one instance in the Talmud of min being used specifically of Christians, and it concerns one of the Yavne sages in the early period, excommunicated, like Akabia ben Mahalalel, for failing to accept the will of the rabbinic majority. This locus classicus concerns Talmudic accounts of the fate of Eliezer ben Hyrcanus who was arrested on suspicion of minut and subsequently brought to trial on a heresy charge before a Roman judge. The incident may have occurred in the reign of Trajan (98-117 CE).

Two versions exist, one at Tosefta Hullin 2:24, the other in a baraita on Avodah Zarah 16b-17a. The charge was dismissed when the governor mistook Eliezer's remark that he put his trust in the judge (God) as a reference to himself. Only later, as he was overcome by depression at being called a min, did he recall, on being prompted by Rabbi Akiva, an incident that occurred in the area of Sepphoris, not far from Nazareth. He had had a casual encounter with a certain Yaakov of Kfar Sikhnin, calling himself a disciple of Jesus, where he experienced pleasure on hearing an halakhic judgment given in the name of Yeshua ben Pantiri/Yeshu ha-notsri. His transgression in listening to and appreciating these remarks, he reflected, consisted in not being mindful of the words of Proverbs 5:8:'Keep your path far from her and do not draw near to the entrance of her house'.

Sadducee hypothesis
The substitution of Sadducees for minim is generally thought to be a result of early modern censorship, However David Flusser, emphasizing as a key piece of evidence a passage in the third 'gate' or chapter of the very early Seder Olam, thought the reading conserved the earliest form, rooted in the Second Temple period, and that the birkat as we now know it was the synthesizing handiwork of Samuel the Lesser. Flusser's argument against the earliest form being directed at Judeo-Christians considers that it arose, rather, as a response to the Sadducees, considered at the time hellenizing 'separatists' (perushim or porshim). This required him to posit that the earliest form must have been a 'Curse of Separatists'(Birkat al-Perushim).

Hypotheses of contemporary Christian evidence
Prior to 70 CE there is no sure evidence that deviant groups were cut off from the community. On the basis of 2 Corinthians 11:24 and Acts 23:1 the apostle Paul, even as a Christian, is thought to have accepted the synagogue's authority over him, implying that even during the time of Pharisee persecution, members of the early Church were seen as a sect within the Jewish fold, and that Paul remained a 'deviant' Jew, a 'reprobate' within the community. That rabbinical sources were familiar with Paul is suggested for some scholars by the fact that, in discussing minim, a rabbi disarms his students' questions by apparently citing 1 Corinthians 11:11 in Hebrew.

Both the Gospel of Matthew and the Didache appear to date to approximately this period of Gamaliel's ascendency, and parts of them can be read as registering a similar paleo-Jewish Christian opposition to these stipulations.

The Gospel of John and Martyn's hypothesis
The Palestinian version of the curse is often discussed in relation to three passages from the Gospel of John (9:22; 12:42; 16:1), dated around 90-100 CE, which speak of Christians being expelled from the synagogue. The influential thesis of J.L.Martyn, advanced in 1968, proposed a link between the curse and passages in this Gospel which speak of Jewish believers in Christ qua Messiah being excluded from the synagogues, implying an authoritative body within the Jewish community has taken some decision of this kind sometime after an authority to do so was established at Yavne.

For the Jews/Judaeans have already agreed that if anyone should confess him to be Messiah he would become an excommunicate from the synagogue  (aposunágōgos)

This, and other passages, for Martyn, reflected not events in Jesus's time, but in the environment of the Johannine community (c.70-100) and the effect of the Birkat haMinim on them. Most scholars have challenged his construal of the 12th benediction. It is argued that rabbinic jurisdiction at that time would not have extended to Asia Minor or Syria, where John appears to have been composed. A dissenting view is that the Johannine passages reflect directly events in Jesus's own lifetime, c.30 CE., and that the Birkat haMinim is an irrelevancy with regard to those passages.

Church Fathers

Justin Martyr
In Patristic literature, the curse is first mentioned by Justin Martyr in his Dialogue with Trypho, whose terminus ante quem is ca.160 CE. This text may reflect a real conversation which might have taken place some time shortly after the outbreak of the Bar Kokhba revolt, or in its immediate aftermath (132-136). Neither the Samaria-born Justin nor the figure depicted as his Jewish interlocutor of gentile education, were familiar with Hebrew, something which strongly undermines the hypothesis that Trypho is to be identified with the bitterly anti-Christian  contemporary Yavne rabbi, Tarphon.

Justin, after charging that Jews dispatched emissaries to calumniate the Christian sect, that rabbis enjoin their flock to avoid getting into discussions with them, and that they mock Jesus, mentions seven times that Jews curse Christ, and in two of these, cursing is said to take place in synagogues. Another four passages relate to this, but lack the word for 'curse'.
Scoff (ἐπισκώψητέ) not at the King of Israel, as the rulers of your synagogues teach you to do after your prayers.'

The fit with the birkat haMinim, in Reuven Kimelman's view, fails on four grounds: (a) Christians are not mentioned (b) the words appropriate to a curse, such as katarâsthai or katanathēmatízein (anathematize) used elsewhere in the dialogue, are not used. Instead we have episkōptein, which is not cursing but mocking; (c) the ridiculing takes place after prayers (metà tēn proseukhēn), not in the midst of them; and (d) the prayer does not name Christ.

Barnard however states that Justin's reference is to the birkat, comparing other Christian testimonies, in Cyprian (200 –258), Lactantius (c.250-325) and Gregory Nyssa (c.335–c.395) that appear to reflect a like knowledge of the curse.

Origen and Tertullian
The prolific theologian Origen (ca.184-234), author of the Hexapla, resident in Caesarea and the most eruditely informed Christian thinker on Jewish matters, has been cited for an against the view that he knew of the curse. The scant evidence in the extant corpus of his huge output consists of three brief comments: (a) a remark in his commentary on the Psalms where he notes that the Jews still anathematize Christ, where the passage is too general to allow any such inference, and may merely echo Justin; and two remarks in his Homilies on Jeremiah, one regarding Jewish cursing of Jesus and plotting against his followers (10.8.2), the other stating:'Enter the synagogue of the Jews and see Jesus flagellated by those with the language of blasphemy' (19.12.31)) These pieces of ostensible evidence likewise fail as testimony, Kimelman argues, because it is Christ, not Christians, who are cursed and no connection is made to prayers.

Likewise Tertullian (155-ca.240) shows an awareness that the Jewish epithet for Christians is Nazareni, – which could be taken as an echo of some form of the birkat mentioning noṣrim -and that among them there are those who dismiss him as the son of a prostitute (quaesturariae filius). Yet again, noṣrim is rarely attested in rabbinical sources, and whether it refers to Christians broadly, or a Jewish Christian sect, cannot be ascertained.

Epiphanius and Jerome
A strong consensus exists for the view that both Epiphanius (310/320-403) and Jerome (c.347–420), both resident in Byzantine Palaestrina, were familiar with the curse. Epiphanius, a former Jew who converted to Christianity at 16, in his Panarion 29:4 writes:
Not only do Jewish people bear hatred against them, they even stand up at dawn, at midday and toward evening, three times a day when they recite their prayers in the synagogues, and curse and anathematize them-saying three times a day, "God curses the Nazoraeans."

It is not disputed that the reference is to the birkat haMinim, since only the Amidah is repeated thrice in the liturgy, and cursing is mentioned. Kimelman, noting that the text does not refer to Christians, but a Jewish-Christian sect, argues that whenever the ha-noṣrim ve-ha-minim phrasing was added (ca.290-377)) it referred to this sect, and not Christians. Ruth Langer likewise argues that Epiphanius does not understand the term orthodox Christians.

His near contemporary Jerome writes:
Until now a heresy is to be found in all parts of the East where Jews have their synagogues; it is called "of the Minaeans" and cursed by the Pharisees up to now. Usually they are named Nazoraeans. They believe in Christ, the Son of God born of Mary, the virgin, and they say about him that he suffered and rose again under Pontius Pilate, in whom we also believe, but since they want to be both Jews and Christians, they are neither Jews nor Christians.'

The similarity between the two passages suggested to Alfred Schmidtke that they both drew on an earlier source, Apollinaris of Laodicea, for this information.

Medieval times
The accusation in patristic literature that Jews at prayer blaspheme against Christ and Christians drops from view in the early medieval period, and only reemerges in the 13th century. Pirqoi ben Baboi does mention a prohibition on the tefillah in Palestine, which some think might reflect censure of this particular prayer in an assumed ordinance laid down by Heraclius, but the one exception is Agobard of Lyons who in 826/7 cites Jerome on synagogue maledictions and states Jews he interviewed confirmed the point. It is thought probable that this attests to the birkat minim text.  Agobard's remarks were part of a remonstration with the Carolingian monarch Louis the Pious, who he thought had granted too many privileges to Jews.  His appeal failed to resonate among ecclesiastical authorities. It may reflect peculiarities in the local Lyon liturgy prior to the spread of Babylonian geonic authority to Europe marked by the revision of prayer books according to the model formed in the Seder Rav 'Amram Gaon. By the end of the first millennium rabbinical Judaism had spread and penetrated throughout the diaspora.

The widespread massacres of Jews that took place with the advent of the First Crusade (1096), and the profound grief these acts engendered among the survivors of numerous devastated communities, heightened whatever negative traditions they may have had about Christianity, and fed into ensuing Jewish polemics against Christians in the medieval world. For Israel Yuval, vengeance on Gentiles as part of a messianic process came to play a key role in Ashkenazi thought as the cursing of non-Jews crystallised into a unique ritual.

From the end of the 12th century onwards, dozens of Jewish polemical manuscripts critical of Christianity were produced. Much of this was not simply defensive, or inframural, but arose from genuine attempts to engage with Christian theologians over issues involving the correct interpretation of biblical texts in Hebrew cited in the Greek Gospels. Nonetheless, from this period onwards, the prayer became the object of 'intense apologetic and polemic preoccupation'.

Within the Jewish fold in this period, Maimonides explained the prayer as arising from exceptional circumstances that required a community response to the emergence of numerous minim who turned Jews away from God. He nowhere indicates who these minim were, other than sorting them into five classes and excluded them from the 100 blessings Jews were required to recite each day. Talmudic authorities in Christian lands, such as the Provençal rabbi Avraham ben Yiẓḥak, reflect the view that the original and ongoing object of the curse was Christians. Rashi maintained that the benediction was ordained 'when the disciples of Jesus had multiplied', and occasionally glosses minim as referring to galaḥim ('tonsured ones'), i.e. Christian priests. Passages in his commentaries equating minim with Christians were later excerpted as evidence to warrant the Church's crackdown on the circulation of Jewish religious literature.

In the late 1230s, a convert from Judaism, Nicholas Donin brought to the notice of Pope Gregory IX a list of 35   passages in the Talmud that might form the ground for questioning that material.  One specific passage refers to the Amidah prayer, described as follows:
Three times every day  in a prayer which they consider more important than others, the Jews curse the clergy of the Church, the kings, and all other people, including hostile Jews. This prayer is in the Talmud and ought to be recited standing with feet together, and one should not speak about anything else nor interrupt it until it is completed even if a serpent is wrapped around one's ankle. This (prayer) men and women recite at least three times a day, men in Hebrew and women in the vernacular, and in both cases in a whisper.

The result flowing from this information was that the Pope issued apostolic letters in 1239 to many European countries ordering a crackdown and seizure of Jewish books through England, France, Aragon, Navarre, Castile, León and Portugal. Copies of the Talmud were to be seized in synagogues on the first Sabbath of Lent, and consigned to Dominicans and Franciscans. Few followed the ordinance with Louis IX of France alone responding by instituting a Trial of the Talmud the following year, so by 1240 the Birkat haMinim was singled out for condemnation. As a result of conversions, among them that of Pablo Christiani who had disputed publicly with Nachmanides in Barcelona (1263), information about what Jewish texts and prayers, including the Aleinu, stated about or hoped would happen to Christians multiplied, and it is possible that the Birkat haMinim text also influenced moves to insist that what Christians considered as numerous blaspheming passages be removed.

One indirect consequence of these discoveries was that calls grew for the creation of chairs in various semitic languages, formalized in 1311, at the Council of Vienne. A papal Bull, Dudum felicis recordationis, (1320) subsequently ordered the confiscation of all copies of the Talmud. Abner of Burgos, a Jewish physician, even before his public conversion at precisely this time, had already begun to write books in Hebrew for the Jewish community in Spain such as the Sefer Milḥamot haShem (Libro de las batallas de Dios) which were highly critical of prayers like the Birkat haMinim.

In 1323/4 this prayer, in a Latin translation, was included with several other items in Bernard Gui's guide for inquisitors, Practica officii inquisitionis heretice gravitatis. Gui added a gloss explaining that though the text does not explicitly mention Christians, the wording used makes it clear that this is what is to be understood by asking God to destroy the minim. Shortly afterwards, in 1331, the Franciscan Hebraist Nicolaus de Lyra (1270 – 1349) in his Postillae perpetuae in universam S. Scripturam, – a work that was to become one of the most authoritative Christian exegeses of the bible – stated that 'from the cradle, they (the Jews) have been nurtured in the hatred of Christ, and they curse Christianity and Christians daily in the synagogues'.

Around 1400, Yom-Tov Lipmann-Mühlhausen wrote his Sefer haNizzaḥon (Book of Contention/Victory) which, unlike an anonymous Ashkenazi polemical work of the same title,  was a prudent and respectful treatise that came to mark a milestone in Jewish-Christian polemics. The work was a refutation of both Christianity and Karaism and affirmed the superiority of rabbinical Judaism. It was composed in the immediate aftermath of the execution of 80 Jews who had languished a year in jail on a charge brought by a convert, Peter, that Jewish rituals and prayers were derogatory of Christians and asked God that the latter be destroyed. The text of the birkat haMinim, together with that of the Aleinu, figured prominently in the accusations. Lipmann-Mühlhausen brushed off the interpretation given, claiming that minim simply meant zweifelte Ketzer heretics whose doubts left them wavering between Judaism and Christianity, and who, having neither religion deserved death.

Modern period
The effects of censorship continued into the early modern period. The invention of printing coincides with renewed concerns by Church authorities for the content of all books. In Germany another Jewish convert Johannes Pfefferkorn, author of an explicit attack on the Birkat haMinim, called in 1509/1510 for the burning of all Jewish texts save the Tanakh, a position that blew up into a decade-long polemic with the Hebraist Johannes Reuchlin, in which theologians supported Pfefferkorn while Christian humanists sided with Reuchlin. With the advent of the Reformation and its endeavours to restore a pristine version of Christianity, Lutheran scholars in particular came to dominate the field, for Hebrew texts provided extensive witness to the ancient world out of which Christianity emerged and thus served to challenge the distortions of Roman Catholicism.

In 1530, a convert to Catholicism from a distinguished Jewish family, Anthonius Margaritha, published a work entitled Der gantz Jüdisch glaub (The Entire Jewish Faith) which translated numerous Jewish prayers, among them the Birkat haMinim, and mentions the daily cursing of Christ. This was to have an important influence on Martin Luther, who quoted extensively from it in his vehemently anti-Judaic excoriation On the Jews and Their Lies (Von den Jüden und iren Lügen) of 1543.

Pope Clement VIII's promulgation in 1596 of the Index of Prohibited Books, one of which was the Talmud, rules were set out for how Hebrew texts published within the ambit of the Catholic world were to be edited with regard to passages deemed hostile to Christians or blasphemous of their faith. Guided by the sefer ha-ziqquq (Book of Expurgation) compiled by the apostate rabbi Domenico Gerosolimitano Jewish scholars were required to blot out the word minim, and expunge or substitute words in prayers and commentaries on the Tanakh which Jewish tradition associated with Christians, such as goyim, nokhri, or nokhrit which were understood as vilifying Gentiles.

By the 17th century, the Cistercian Hebraist Giulio Bartolocci anticipated the modern view of the primitive text, arguing that the benediction, while targeting Christians, was mainly directed at others, whom both Jews and paleo-Christians would consider heretics, such as Theudas at Acts 5: 36. As mastery of Hebrew progressed, many Christian polemical works against rabbinical Judaism began to emerge. Martí's manuscript had long been lost from view until it was finally printed in 1651, and reprinted in Leipzig in 1678. Shortly afterwards. Johann Christoph Wagenseil's Tela ignea Satanae ('The Flaming Arrows of Satan', 1681) deployed extensive quotes from Jewish writings in an attempt to skewer Judaism on a charge of enmity against Christianity. This was partly motivated by the requirement of German Protestants in a confessional state to defend their religion. This vein culminated with the publication of Johannes Eisenmenger's 2 volume Endecktes Judentum, (Judaism Unmasked, 1700) which has an extensive discussion of the 12th benediction. Eisenmenger's work was soon to achieve notoriety as it became the standard source for antisemites opposed to the cause of Jewish emancipation in the 19th century.

Post-war
The culmination of anti-Semitism in the Holocaust led, in the post-war years, to a re-examination of the anti-Judaic elements at the core of Christian tradition. In 1965, the Second Vatican Council published the encyclical Nostra aetate which disavowed the accusation of deicide and determined that anti-Semitism was incompatible with Christianity. While theological difficulties remain, in rejecting supersessionism, it prepared the way for the hermeneutic vindication of  God's covenant with the Hebrews as irrevocable, co-existing with and complementary to the New Testament covenant. and a recognition of the possibility that adherents of other, non-Christian religions may achieve salvation.

In the Pentateuch, a primary model for reconciliation is that between Jacob and Esau at Genesis 33:3-4, where the latter kisses (nishek) his brother. Rabbinical tradition, unable to alter the sacred text, adds a dotted superscript over the verb, indicating the given reading was to be cancelled, and glossed it with a pun, suggesting that what was actually meant was that Esau had bitten (nashakh) his brother Jacob, who became the patriarch of the forefathers of the Jews, the Israelites.  Esau thereafter became a metonym successively for Rome and Christianity. In the prewar writings of Abraham Isaac Kook, the Ashkenazi chief rabbi in Mandatory Palestine and founder of the highly influential Mercaz HaRav yeshiva, Christianity is usually described as minut (heresy).

In modern Israel, these Christian overtures, according to Karma Ben Johanan, have met with a chilly reception characterized by increasing hostility among the Orthodox rabbinate, which considers Christianity to be halakhically idolatrous. Tradition excluded the possibility that reconciliation with Rome was on the table. The censorship of contested terms due to Christian pressure has led to moves to restore the original wording.  Israel Yuval, reviewing Ben Johanan's book, recalls that even the otherwise liberal Orthodox intellectual Yeshayahu Leibowitz railed, at the time of the Eichman trial, at attempts to justify 'the vermin [sheretz] of Christianity' and reminded his interlocutor, David Flusser, that "We curse Christianity three times every day."

See also
 Pharisees
 Split of early Christianity and Judaism
 heresy in Judaism
 Origins of Rabbinic Judaism
 Origins of Christianity
 Christianity in the 1st century
 History of early Christianity
 History of Antisemitism
 Good Friday prayer for the Jews

Notes

Citations

Sources

  

Early Christianity and Judaism
Heresy in Judaism